Waterways is a suburb in Melbourne, Victoria, Australia,  south-east of Melbourne's Central Business District, located within the City of Kingston local government area. Waterways recorded a population of 2,422 at the 2021 census.

Originally a housing development, it is surrounded by the much larger suburbs of Braeside, Aspendale Gardens, Keysborough and Bangholme, and the Mornington Peninsula Freeway traverses the western side of the suburb.

The suburb's location is environmentally sensitive as it is situated directly between two important conservation areas, the Braeside Park and Edithvale Wetlands. Planning permits are strictly regulated and gardens monitored to prevent the introduction of foreign species that may become invasive and threaten the abundant native wildlife in the area. The Mornington Peninsula branch of the Bird Observers Club of Australia or PENBOC have documented 105 different species of birds in the area, and domestic cats are also forbidden for this reason.

History
Construction on Waterways Estate began in May 2000, due to end within five years. The name "Waterways" comes from a number of man-made lakes, lagoons and wetlands in and around the estate, which form an interconnected waterway to the Mordialloc Creek and a wildlife corridor connecting Braeside Park to its north and the Edithvale Wetlands to its south.  Melbourne Water uses these waters as a filtration system for the (typically polluted) urban water flowing down from Dandenong and Mordialloc Creeks then into Port Phillip Bay.

Although the development was due to be completed in 2006, the developer applied for, and was subsequently granted permission from Kingston Council to increase the suburb's size. The final stage of the development, called Argyle, was completed in July 2011.

Waterways was rated higher than Toorak, Brighton or Canterbury – or anywhere else, apart from the 63 people living on South Wharf – in an index of socio-economic advantage compiled from the 2011 census.

Water bodies 
Waterways have multiple bodies of water interconnected by channels, underground aqueducts and wetlands, all surrounding an elongated land known as "the Island". Going clockwise from the northwest are the following:
 Sunset Lagoon — east of the Mordialloc Freeway, northwest of the island and immediately south of Governor Road.
 Portland Lagoon — west of Bowen Parkway and north of Portland Place, separated from Sunset Lagoon by a wetland and boardwalk.
 Waterways Lake — east of Bowen Parkway, north of the Island and south of Waterside Drive, the only waterbody of Waterways that allows boating.
 St. Clair Lagoon — east of the Island and west of Springvale Road, separated from Waterways Lake by Island Point Avenue (an U-bend of Waterside Drive).
 Pelican Lagoon — north of Mordialloc Creek and south of the Island, separated from St. Clair Lagoon by a small peninsula.
 Black Swan Lagoon — north of Mordialloc Creek, southwest of the Island and east of Bowen Parkway, separated from Pelican Lagoon by a wetland and boardwalk.
 Parkway Lagoon — north of Mordialloc Creek, east of Bowen Parkway and partly overpassed by the Mordialloc Freeway, separated from Black Swan Lagoon by an isthmus with a dirt/muddy trail, the smallest of all lagoons.
 Westbridge Lagoon — east of Mordialloc Freeway and west of Bowen Parkway and the Island, separated from Sunset Lagoon by a grassland that can serve as a retarding basin in case of flooding.
 Mordi Yallock Lagoon — west of (and separated from the other waterbodies by) Mordialloc Freeway and north of Mordialloc Creek, the largest of all lagoons.

Gallery

References

Suburbs of Melbourne
Suburbs of the City of Kingston (Victoria)
Constructed wetlands in Australia